Phyllonorycter obtusifoliella is a moth of the family Gracillariidae. It is known from the Peloponnese and Cyprus.

The larvae feed on Acer creticum, Acer obtusifolium and Acer sempervirens.

References

obtusifoliella
Moths of Europe
Moths described in 1974